General Carl Stig Norén (10 May 1908 – 10 September 1996) was a Swedish Air Force officer. Norén started his military career in the Swedish Navy and was after a few years transferred to the Swedish Air Force where he would remain for over 30 years. Norén finished his career by being the Chief of the Air Force from 1968 to 1973.

Early life
Norén was born on 10 May 1908 in Stockholm, Sweden, the son of the commander of the 1st rank Karl Norén and his wife Marianne (née af Sillén). He passed studentexamen in Gothenburg in 1927.

Career
Norén was commissioned as an officer in the became Swedish Navy in 1930 with then rank of acting sub-lieutenant. Norén served aboard aircraft cruiser , the Swedish Navy so far the only aircraft-carrying ship. Thus, he was also one of the few Swedish pilots who had experience in aircraft starting with aircraft catapult. Norén belonged to the group of young naval officers who early made their way over to the young and growing Swedish Air Force. Norén was promoted to underlöjtnant in 1932 and underwent flight training from 1932 to 1933 and was promoted to löjtnant in 1934. He was then transferred to the Swedish Air Force where he became löjtnant in 1936. Norén underwent the general course of the Royal Swedish Naval Staff College from 1937 to 1938 and served mainly at the Air Staff from 1938 to 1943.

Norén was promoted to kapten in 1940 and underwent the staff course of the Royal Swedish Air Force Staff College from 1941 to 1942. He was a teacher at the Royal Swedish Air Force Staff College from 1943 and was promoted to major in 1944. Norén was promoted to lieutenant colonel in 1947 and was head of the Operation Department at the Air Staff from 1947 to 1949 and was appointed commanding officer of the Skaraborg Wing (F 7) the following year. He was promoted to colonel in 1951. Norén was commanding officer of Skaraborg Wing from 1950 to 1957 and Inspector of the Control and Reporting System of the Swedish Air Force (Inspektören för luftbevakningen) from 1957 to 1960. As Inspector of the Control and Reporting System he contributed to the realization of the construction of the modern combat management and air surveillance system called STRIL 60.

In 1960 Norén was promoted to major general and appointed Chief of the Air Staff. As Chief of the Air Staff, he was one of the promoters of a joint executive management of the entire Swedish defence. Norén stayed as Chief of the Air Staff until 1964 when he was appointed commanding officer of the First Air Group (E 1). After two years Norén was promoted to lieutenant general and was appointed military commander of the Southern Military District (Milo S). He was the first military commander of Milo S with overall responsibility for the army, navy and air force under the new military area organisation. Norén was appointed Chief of the Air Force in 1968 and was then faced with several difficult decisions. Increased financial resources coupled with increasing demands on the aircraft's performance and the effects of weapons imbued the defense debate. In the military command he conveyed his views in a way that created respect. He was then able to fulfill the Air Force's requirements, so that the Swedish air defense still would remain a significant factor in the Swedish defense. Norén would remain as Chief of the Air Force until 1973 when he retired and was promoted to full general.

Personal life
In 1935 he married Ulla Nordenson (1910–1996), the daughter of Göran Nordenson and Märta Bagge. He was the father of Märta (born 1938) and Ebba (born 1939). Norén died on 10 September 1996, a few months after his wife, and they were both buried on 18 October 1996 buried at Norra begravningsplatsen in Stockholm.

Dates of rank
1930 – Acting sub-lieutenant (Swedish Navy)
1932 – Underlöjtnant (Swedish Navy)
1934 – Lieutenant (Swedish Navy)
1936 – Lieutenant (Swedish Air Force)
1940 – Captain
1944 – Major
1947 – Lieutenant colonel
1951 – Colonel
1960 – Major general
1966 – Lieutenant general
1973 – General

Awards and decorations

Swedish
   Commander Grand Cross of the Order of the Sword (6 June 1968)
   Commander 1st Class of the Order of the Sword (6 June 1957)
   Knight of the Order of Vasa
   Swedish Women's Voluntary Defence Organization Royal Medal of Merit in silver
   Swedish Association of Voluntary Observers Medal of Merit in silver
  Royal Swedish Aero Club's Gold Medal (Kungliga Svenska Aeroklubbens guldmedalj)

Foreign
   Commander with Star of the Order of St. Olav (1 July 1961)
   Aeronautical Medal

Honours
Member of the Royal Swedish Academy of War Sciences (1948)
Honorary member of the Royal Swedish Society of Naval Sciences (1971)

References

1908 births
1996 deaths
Swedish Air Force generals
Military personnel from Stockholm
Members of the Royal Swedish Academy of War Sciences
Members of the Royal Swedish Society of Naval Sciences
Commanders Grand Cross of the Order of the Sword
Knights of the Order of Vasa
Burials at Norra begravningsplatsen